Zilpah Polly Grant Banister (May 30, 1794 – December 3, 1874) was an American educator known primarily for founding Ipswich Female Seminary in Ipswich, Massachusetts, in 1828.

Zilpah Grant began teaching at the age of fifteen.  Eventually she saved up enough money to enter Byfield Academy and study under the charismatic clergyman Joseph Emerson, a leading proponent of women's education.  At Byfield, she befriended Mary Lyon, who later taught with Grant for several years.

From 1824 to 1827 (or 1828), Grant served as principal of Adams Female Academy at Derry, New Hampshire.  She then founded Ipswich Female Academy.  Grant's curricula at Adams and Ipswich reflected Emerson's influence; they blended rigorous academic studies, moral oversight, and teacher training.  Grant expected students to study for the joy of learning, rather than working for grades or prizes. Mary Lyon was Grant's assistant and, later, principal at Ipswich until she left to found Mount Holyoke Seminary in 1834. 

On September 7, 1841, Grant married William B. Banister and moved with him to Newburyport, Massachusetts. She continued to be active to promote women's education, and published a pamphlet entitled Hints on Education in 1856.

References
Capen, Eliza Paul, and Leonard W. Labaree.  "Zilpah Grant and the Art of Teaching: 1829."  New England Quarterly 20 (1947): 347–364.

External links
Burial place of Zilpah P. Grant Banister in Oak Hill Cemetery, Newburyport, Massachusetts.
Zilpah P. Grant Banister Papers at Mount Holyoke College
Beecher family papers (including letters to Zilpah Grant Banister) at Mount Holyoke College

1794 births
1874 deaths
American educators
People from Newburyport, Massachusetts